The British Columbia Parks and Protected Areas System is the collection of physical properties owned or administered by BC Parks, an agency of the British Columbia Ministry of Environment and Climate Change Strategy. These protected areas are established by order-in-council under one of several different pieces of enabling legislation.

The system includes 644 provincial parks, 2 recreation areas, 156 conservancies, 84 protected areas, and 148 ecological reserves. Four provincial parks are designated UNESCO World Heritage Sites, while 24 provincial parks are designated UNESCO Biosphere Reserves.

Provincial parks by regional district
This is a list of provincial parks of British Columbia by regional district.

 Alberni-Clayoquot
 Bulkley-Nechako
 Capital
 Cariboo
 Central Coast
 Central Kootenay
 Central Okanagan
 Columbia-Shuswap
 Comox Valley
 Cowichan Valley
 East Kootenay
 Fraser-Fort George
 Fraser Valley
 Kitimat-Stikine
 Kootenay Boundary
 Metro Vancouver
 Mount Waddington
 Nanaimo
 North Coast
 North Okanagan
 Northern Rockies
 Okanagan-Similkameen
 Peace River
 qathet
 Squamish-Lillooet
 Stikine Region
 Strathcona
 Sunshine Coast
 Thompson-Nicola

List of provincial parks and protected areas
Please refer to the BC Parks website for lists of parks/protected areas and ecological reserves.

Former Provincial Parks
This list includes provincial parks that were cancelled. Provincial parks that were cancelled for the purpose of moving the land into a different provincial park are not included. While some provincial parks were deleted as they were deemed to be not suitable for park purposes, most of the parks were deleted so they could be transferred to a municipality or regional district to be local or regional parks. In 2004 several provincial parks were moved into the federal Gulf Islands National Park; likewise a few provincial parks were moved into the Pacific Rim National Park and Gwaii Haanas National Park when those federal parks were established.

See also
List of protected areas of British Columbia
List of protected areas of Alberta

References

External links 
Alphabetical listing of provincial parks and protected areas on bcparks.ca
Map of provincial parks and protected areas on bcparks.ca

 
Provincial Parks
British Columbia